Dora Brandes is a 1916 German silent film directed by Magnus Stifter, starring Asta Nielsen, with a screenplay by Martin Jørgensen, and Louis Levy. Dora is an actress who is involved with a political man, Gustave, as her lover. With money from Dora's former admirer, she decides to help further Gustave's political career. Once he becomes a parliamentary deputy, he achieves his goals and then leaves Dora. Dora cannot handle the betrayal and begins to drink and starts on a social decline. Years later, Gustave becomes a minister and Dora returns to his life to help him yet again with his career. Gustave does not accept Dora as a lover again due to her ill past causing Dora to commit suicide.

Cast
 Asta Nielsen as Dora Brandes
 Ludwig Trautmann as Gustav Calvia, journalist
 Max Laurance as Grev d'Albert, politiker

References

Bibliography

External links

1916 films
Films of the German Empire
Films directed by Magnus Stifter
German silent feature films
German black-and-white films
1910s German films